Lacerta is a genus of lizards of the family Lacertidae.

Taxonomy
Lacerta was a fairly diverse genus containing around 40 species, until it was "split" into nine genera in 2007 by Arnold, Arribas & Carranza.

Fossil record
The earliest known members of the genus Lacerta are known from early Miocene epoch fossils indistinguishable in anatomy from the modern green lizards such as Lacerta viridis.

Species
The genus Lacerta contains the following species.

Some species formerly in Lacerta
Arranged alphabetically by specific name:
Anatololacerta anatolica – Anatolian rock lizard
Atlantolacerta andreanskyi – Atlas dwarf lizard, Andreansky's lizard 
Iberolacerta aranica – Aran rock lizard
Iberolacerta aurelioi – Aurelio's rock lizard
Archaeolacerta bedriagae – Bedriaga's rock lizard
Iberolacerta bonnali – Pyrenean rock lizard
Apathya cappadocica – Anatolian lizard
Darevskia chlorogaster – Green-bellied lizard
Phoenicolacerta cyanisparsa
Omanosaura cyanura – blue-tailed Oman lizard
Anatololacerta danfordi – Danford's lizard
Darevskia defilippii – Elburs lizard
Darevskia dryada 
Teira dugesii – Madeiran wall lizard
Hellenolacerta graeca – Greek rock lizard
Iberolacerta horvathi – Horvath's rock lizard
Omanosaura jayakari – Jayakar's lizard
Phoenicolacerta kulzeri
Phoenicolacerta laevis – Lebanon lizard
Timon lepidus – ocellated lizard, foot lizard
Iberolacerta monticola – Iberian rock lizard
Dinarolacerta mosorensis - Mosor rock lizard
Podarcis muralis – common wall lizard
Anatololacerta oertzeni
Dalmatolacerta oxycephala – sharp-snouted rock lizard
Parvilacerta parva – dwarf lizard
Darevskia steineri
Zootoca vivipara – viviparous lizard
Iranolacerta zagrosica

References

Further reading
Arnold EN, Arribas OJ, Carranza S. 2007. "Systematics of the Palaearctic and Oriental lizard tribe Lacertini (Squamata: Lacertidae: Lacertinae), with descriptions of eight new genera". Zootaxa 1430: 1-86.
Linnaeus C. 1758. Systema naturae per regna tria naturae, secundum classes, ordines, genera, species, cum characteribus, differentiis, synonymis, locis. Tomus I. Editio Decima, Reformata. Stockholm: L. Salvius. 824 pp. (Lacerta, new genus, p. 200). (in Latin).

 
Lizard genera
Extant Miocene first appearances
Langhian first appearances
Taxa named by Carl Linnaeus

eu:Gardatxo